Edholm may refer to:

Edholm (surname), including a list of people with the name
Edholm, Nebraska, United States

See also

Edholm Point, a headland in Antarctica
Edholm's law